Sargent is a ghost town located in central California on the Santa Clara-San Benito County border. The largest portion of the town was on the Santa Clara County, or north, side of the county line. It is 150 feet above mean sea level. It appeared on 1950s Thomas Brothers maps but has dropped off the company's 21st century maps.

The former town site is located alongside US 101 at the current location of a sugar beet loading conveyor along the Union Pacific Railroad track west of US 101. The feature appears on a variety of railroad maps from the 1930s to present and may have been a passenger train stop at some point in history.

The location is named for James P. Sargent (1823–1890) owner of the Rancho Juristac Mexican Land grant. A Sargent Hills and Sargent Creek are also located nearby to the west.

The ZIP Code is 95045 and the community is inside area code 408.

Sargent oil field
An active oil field with about four operating wells exists about 5.25 miles at 199 degrees off true North from the eastbound SR152 and US101 interchange. The area is called the Sargent Oil Field. The field is located on Tar Creek just north of the Santa Cruz County line. Tar Creek is sometimes called the Spanish equivalent, La Brea Creek, on some historic maps.

Exploration dates back to 1886, probably as a result of oil seepages along the La Brea Creek.

References

External links
 PDF Oil field map of Sargent area.

Unincorporated communities in California
Unincorporated communities in Santa Clara County, California
Unincorporated communities in San Benito County, California